John Whalley  (born 8 May 1947) is a Canadian economist. He is a Professor Emeritus at the University of Western Ontario (he previously held the William G. Davis Chair in International Trade), and a Distinguished Fellow of the Centre for International Governance Innovation.

He studied Economics at the University of Essex in the United Kingdom, graduating BA in 1968, and from Yale University holds the degrees of MA (1970), MPhil (1971), PhD (1973). At Yale, he was a teaching assistant to Joseph Stiglitz.

He was elected a Fellow of the Econometric Society in 1990.

In 2009, Whalley was awarded a Hellmuth Prize for Achievement in Research at the University of Western Ontario. In 2012, he received the Izaak Walton Killam Memorial Prize awarded by the Canada Council.

References

1947 births
Living people
Alumni of the University of Essex
Yale Graduate School of Arts and Sciences alumni
Canadian economists
Academic staff of the University of Western Ontario
Fellows of the Royal Society of Canada
Fellows of the Econometric Society